Shogran is a hill station situated on a plateau in the Kaghan Valley, northern Pakistan at a height of  above sea level. It is located in the province of Khyber Pakhtunkhwa.

The road from Islamabad to the region is paved and measures . Mobile phone services are provided by Telenor and Zong. It's mainly populated during the summer. Entry might be restricted when senior officials visit or stay at rest houses.

Weather

Shogran is opened for visitors in summers and winters (although in winter only one hotel is open). June – August every year is the peak season. During this period, the weather remains temperate. Monsoon winds bring heavy rains with occasional hail storms. Unexpected thunder storms and heavy rains sometimes create difficulties for visitors to move around. During the winter months the valley is usually covered in snow. Since 2005 Shogran is accessible in winter.

See also
Siri Lake
Payee Lake
Kaghan Valley

References

External links
 http://emergingpakistan.gov.pk/travel/place-to-visit/khyber-pakhtunkhwa/shogran/

Tourist attractions in Khyber Pakhtunkhwa
Hill stations in Pakistan
Mansehra District